Emil Holub (7 October 1847 – 21 February 1902) was a Czech physician, explorer, cartographer, and ethnographer in Africa.

Early life
Holub was born in Holice in eastern Bohemia (then within the Austrian Empire, now the Czech Republic), to the family of a municipal doctor. After studying at a German-language grammar school in Žatec (Saaz), he was admitted at Prague University where he obtained a degree as a doctor of medicine (1872).

Expeditions in Africa
Inspired to visit Africa by the diaries of David Livingstone, Holub travelled to Cape Town, South Africa, shortly after graduation and eventually settled in Dutoitspan near Kimberley to practise medicine. After eight months, Holub set out in a convoy of local hunters on a two-month experimental expedition, or "scientific safari", where he began to assemble a large natural history collection.

In 1873, Holub set out on his second scientific safari, devoting his attention to the collection of ethnographic material. On his third expedition in 1875, he ventured all the way to the Zambezi river and made the first detailed map of the region surrounding Victoria Falls. Holub also wrote and published the first book account of the Victoria Falls published in English in Grahamstown in 1879.

After returning to Prague for several years, Holub made plans for a bold African expedition. In 1883, Holub, along with his new wife Rosa (1865–1958) and six European guides, set out to do what no one had done before: explore the entire length of Africa from Cape Town all the way to Egypt. However, the expedition was troubled by illness and the uncooperative Ila tribesmen and Holub's team was forced to turn back in 1886.

Holub mounted two exhibitions, highly attended but ending up in financial loss, in 1891 in Vienna and in 1892 in Prague. Frustrated that he was unable to find a permanent home for his large collection of artefacts, he gradually sold or gave away parts of it to museums, scientific institutions and schools.

Later Holub published a series of documents, contributing to papers and magazines, and delivering lectures. His early death came in Vienna on 21 February 1902, from lingering complications of malaria and other diseases he had acquired while in Africa.

Commemorations of Holub's legacy

 In 1884, Daniel Oliver published and described in Hooker's book Icones Plantarum (Hooker's Icon. Pl.) Vol.15 in table 1475, the plant Holubia saccata, a monotypic genus of flowering plants belonging to the family Pedaliaceae. It was named in Holub's honour.
 In 1949, a monument to Holub by Jindřich Soukup was unveiled in his hometown of Holice.
 In 1952, Czech movie Velké dobrodružství (Great Adventure) was filmed about Holub's expeditions.
 In 1970, the town of Holice opened a museum dedicated to Emil Holub near the main post office with an associated monument nearby. Since 1999 the gymnasium in the town bears explorer's name.
 On 20 February 2002 the Czech National Bank issued a CZK 200 silver coin commemorating the 100th anniversary of Dr. Emil Holub's death
 Between 2002 and 2006, the Embassy of the Czech Republic in Harare organized several events to commemorate Emil Holub.
In a 2005 poll, he was voted #90 of the 100 greatest Czechs.
 In September 2005, exactly 130 years since Holub's first visit to the Victoria Falls, a bust of Holub by the Zimbabwean sculptor Last Mahwahwa was unveiled by the Ambassador of the Czech Republic, Jaroslav Olša, Jr., and the Ambassador of the Republic of Austria, Michael Brunner, in front of the National Museum of Zambia in Livingstone, the city adjacent to the Victoria Falls.

Works
   (Reprinted (1975), Johannesburg: Africana Book Society.)

References

Sources

Further reading

In German
Gabriele Riz: Leben und Werk des Afrikaforschers Emil Holub. 1847–1902. Diplomarbeit. Universität Wien, Wien 1985.

In English
To the Upper Zambezi. Some 19th Century Notes of Czech Traveller Emil Holub (eds. Rob S. Burrett and Jaroslav Olša, Jr. Prague: Nová vlna 2020)
Dark Deeds. Some Hunting Memoirs of the Nineteenth Century Czech Traveller Emil Holub  (Ed. Rob S. Burrett. Gweru: Mambo Press 2006) 
The Culture and Society in South Africa of 1870s and 1880s – Views and Consideration of Dr. Emil Holub (Josef Kandert. Prague: Naprstek Museum 1998)
Emil Holub's Travels north of the Zambezi (ed. Ladislav Holý. Manchester: Manchester University Press 1975)
The Victoria Falls. A few Pages from the Diary of Emil Holub, M.D., written during His third Trip into the Interior of Southern Africa (Grahamstown: no publisher, reprinted with a foreword by Jaroslav Olša, jr. Bulawayo: Books of Zimbabwe 2004)

In Czech

 (Also in Romanian edition as (1963) La nord de Zambezi. București: Editura Tineretului.)

External links 

 
 
 Museum of Dr. Emil Holub
 Short biography (in Czech)
 Longer biography of Holub (in English)
 

1847 births
1902 deaths
People from Holice
People from the Kingdom of Bohemia
19th-century Czech people
Czech explorers
Explorers of Africa
Charles University alumni
South African explorers